Saw Pyei Chantha was duchess of Taungdwin from 1441 to the 1470s, and duchess of Toungoo from 1459 to 1466. She was a daughter of King Thihathu (r. 1421–1425) and Queen Saw Min Hla of Ava, and a younger sister of King King Min Hla of Ava (r. 1425).

Brief
Princess Saw Pyei Chantha had two full siblings, older brother Min Hla, and a younger sister Shwe Pyi Shin Me, and four older maternal half-siblings—Minye Kyawhtin, Min Hla Htut, Minye Aung Naing, Saw Min Phyu, from his mother's first marriage to her paternal uncle Crown Prince Minye Kyawswa. Her mother was wedded to her father in 1416, a year after the death of Minye Kyawswa, by her grandfather King Minkhaung I (r. 1400–1421).

In 1434, the princess married Thiri Zeya Thura, a nephew of King Thado. The couple was still alive in 1472/73. A contemporary mawgun inscription says Thiri Zeya Thura and Saw Pyei Chantha of Taungdwin pledged their loyalty to King Thihathura of Ava in 1472/73.

Ancestry

Notes

References

Bibliography
 
 
 

Ava dynasty
Burmese people of Shan descent